Hold That Lion is a 1926 American silent comedy film directed by William Beaudine, starring Douglas MacLean, Walter Hiers, and Constance Howard.

The film was written by Rosalie Mulhall (story) and Joseph F. Poland. Previously thought lost, the Library of Congress holds this title in addition to the like titled  1947 Three Stooges short.

Plot

Cast
Douglas MacLean as Jimmie Hastings
Walter Hiers as Dick Warren
Constance Howard as Marjorie Brand
Cyril Chadwick as H. Horace Smythe
Wade Boteler as Andrew MacTavish
George C. Pearce as Professor Brand

References

External links

Lobby poster; movie artwork

1926 films
1926 comedy films
Silent American comedy films
American silent feature films
American black-and-white films
1920s rediscovered films
Rediscovered American films
Films with screenplays by Joseph F. Poland
Films directed by William Beaudine
1920s American films